The Stuart Dunlap House on 7th Ave. in Mandan, North Dakota  was listed on the National Register of Historic Places in 1992.

History
The residence and accompanying carriage house was built in 1904.  It was designed and built by N. A.  Freeburg (1862-1942), a Swedish born general contractor.   Freeburg and his partner Charles Kidd built several of the prominent structures in the community including the First National Bank Building in the Mandan Commercial Historic District and the Freeburg - Esser Home.

The Stuart Dunlap house is associated with Hoy Sylvester Russell, founder of the Mandan Creamery and Produce Company.  In 1923, Hoy Sylvester Russell (1886-1958) and his wife  Cora Agnes (Walton) Russell (1888–1971) purchased the Stuart Dunlap home where they lived and raised their family. The Mandan Creamery and Produce Company commenced operation in 1915. Mandan Creamery and Produce Company as now known as the Cloverdale Foods Company.

References

Houses on the National Register of Historic Places in North Dakota
Queen Anne architecture in North Dakota
Houses completed in 1904
Houses in Morton County, North Dakota
National Register of Historic Places in Morton County, North Dakota
1904 establishments in North Dakota
Swedish-American culture in North Dakota
Mandan, North Dakota